Life of the Party  is a 2017 Australian  independent Comedy/Suspense film directed and produced by Michael Budd it represents Budd's second feature film. The film stars Budd, Holly Brisley,  Christopher Kirby and Georgia Chara and Damian Sommerlad. It premiered on 17 July 2017 in Australia and on 14 September 2018 at the Arena Cinelounge Sunset Los Angeles in the U.S. state of California. The film was shot completely in Sydney, Mosman.

Plot 
A heartwarming story of three friends who try to break the world record for the worlds longest house party.

Cast
 Holly Brisley as Sandra
 Michael Budd as Kray
 Damian Sommerlad as Jason
 Christopher Kirby as Perry
 Georgia Chara as Bea
 Talin Agon as Becky
 Greg Eccleston as Myron
 Isaro Kayitesi as Gracie
 Hayley Gia Hughes as Jessie
 Johnny Lahoud as Geno
 Michela Carattini as Sarah
 Rachael Steel as Layla / Dj-Singer
 Ben Hamilton as Noodle Guy / Party Guest
 Lucy Kate Westbrook as Homebuyer
 Toks James as Winston
 Alexandra Erickson as Drunk Girl
 Quentin Yung as Paul
 David Nash as Big John Arm Wrestler
 Shane Millward as Olaf Goldstien
 Wayne Harricks as Clinton
 Corinne Deanna Campbell as Random Party Girl
 Tor Dollhouse as Party Guest
 Lynne Baillie as Party Guest
 Leanne Watson Chamouille as TV Producer
 Lexi Gallo as Linda
 Anthony Vercoe as Carl
 Aria McCarthy-Lochner as Party Guest
 Brad Free as 	Party Guest
 Harris Budd as Child
 Ada Reinthal as Broken Nose Girl
 Theresa McCarthy as Party Guest
 Lisa Gilbertson as College Parent (uncredited)

References

External links
 
 
 

2017 films
Films shot in Australia
Australian comedy-drama films
2010s English-language films